"Brokenheartsville" is a song written by Donny Kees, Blake Mevis, Randy Boudreaux, and Clint Daniels and recorded by American country music singer Joe Nichols. It was released in November 2002 as the second single from Nichols' 2002 album Man with a Memory. The song became Nichols' first number one hit on the U.S. Billboard Hot Country Singles & Tracks (now Hot Country Songs) chart and earned him his second consecutive Grammy nomination for Best Male Country Vocal Performance. The song also was later covered by Johnny Rodriguez on his 2011 album Live from Texas.

Critical reception
Wade Jessen of Billboard called the song a "beer-can-crushing, honky-tonk lament of lost love."

Music video
The video starts out with Nichols' girlfriend rides off with another man in an Eldorado convertible. A depressed Nichols starts drinking at a bar in the city, and talking to the other bar patrons friends, singing the song. The bar patrons sitting with Nichols as well as the bartender are seen mouthing the final words of each line of the first chorus. Once the first verse ends, the bar rotates to show a popular night club. They watch a singer sing live on stage. 

In the second verse, Nichols and the bar patrons are being consoled and entertained by the night clubbers who cheer them all up. Meanwhile Nichols girlfriend is still riding around with the other man in his car, which ends up breaking down, much to her dismay while the new boyfriend just shrugs his shoulders as if nothing is wrong. Back at the night club, when the singer is done on stage, Nichols takes the stage himself and sings the final verse and two choruses with his band, before returning to the bar and having a drink, to which he toasts with his buddies before taking a sip and giving a blunt face by not liking the taste. The video was filmed in downtown Nashville, Tennessee and the outside shots of the car were filmed near the Bridgestone Arena. The video was directed by Trey Fanjoy.

Chart performance
"Brokenheartsville" debuted at No. 56 on the U.S. Billboard Hot Country Singles & Tracks chart for the week of November 2, 2002. The song spent 31 weeks on the chart, reaching number one for the week ending March 29, 2003, where it remained at the top spot for one week.

Year-end charts

References

2002 singles
Joe Nichols songs
Music videos directed by Trey Fanjoy
Songs written by Clint Daniels
Songs written by Randy Boudreaux
Show Dog-Universal Music singles
Song recordings produced by Brent Rowan
Songs written by Blake Mevis
2002 songs
Songs written by Donny Kees